Saint Flannan's College is an Irish co-educational secondary school located in Ennis, County Clare, which takes its name from the 7th century  patron saint of the Dál gCais. Formerly an all-boys boarding school, the first girls class was entered in 2002 and in 2005 the boarding school was closed. In 2003 an extension which added over 20 new rooms to the college was completed. A measure of the expansion that has taken place over the past thirty years is that in 1962, there were some 370 pupils, 140 of whom were day boys. Only 37 teachers were in attendance. By 2004, enrollment had risen to more than 1,001 students. Staff numbers had risen to 60. In September 2002, co-ed classes were introduced in First Year. In September 2003, a new wing containing extensive new facilities was opened. In the 2010–11 school year there were 1,206 students.

History
In 1846, the Diocese of Killaloe lent its prestige and patronage to the private academy conducted at Springfield House, Ennis by a Mr Fitzsimons. Fortified by diocesan support, the school would henceforth function as both a diocesan seminary and as a day and boarding school for Catholic boys. Under this arrangement, the Springfield House school flourished, and by the early 1850s was already enticing pupils away from Erasmus Smith College, College Road. Springfield pupils were conspicuously successful in obtaining scholarships to the Queen's Colleges at Galway and Cork (now NUI Galway and University College Cork). In 1859, Fitzsimons added a new wing to the college in order to cater for the increased number of students. The same year, Springfield affiliated to the newly established University of London as a preparatory college. In 1862, financial difficulties caused Fitzsimons to terminate his connection with Springfield, and under his successor the college changed directions sharply. The affiliation with the University of London was dropped for one with Newman's Catholic University in Dublin. Fitzsimons, for his part, embarked on a new career in Argentina, and within the space of a few years set up four schools. Fitzsimons died there in 1871 during an outbreak of yellow fever.

In 1865 the diocese broke with Springfield altogether and set up a diocesan college completely under its control at #12 Bindon Street, now a solicitor's office, and soon after became known as St. Flannan's Literary Institute, under a clerical headmaster, known for the first time as a president. The following year, the institute was able to acquire the Springfield premises after the school there closed. After a comparatively short interval, a search was begun to find a site on which a larger college campus could be developed. Work finally began in 1879 on land acquired on the Limerick Road, and the college was built to a rather severe neo-Gothic design. Financial problems occasioned by the bankruptcy of the builder led to alterations in the plans, and some of the finishing touches were postponed, never to be completed. Visitors to the college are often shown such features as the plain uncarved label stops around the Gothic windows and the Clock Tower, with no clock — all now part of the fabric of college tradition. 

Perhaps the most famous president of the college was Canon William Kennedy, head of St. Flannan's between 1919 and 1932. During the Anglo-Irish War, the college was a hotbed of separatist sentiment, from where the Canon personally organised the collection of the famous Dáil Loan in Clare. Still preserved in the college are letters from both Éamon de Valera and Michael Collins in connection with this undertaking. Canon Kennedy was arrested in July 1921 by British forces and interned on Bere Island. The early decades of the new state were grim as only limited funding was available for secondary education, and most costs had to be met out from the college's resources alone, but some curriculum development did take place. In 1937, for example, Physics was introduced as a subject for the Leaving Certificate, remaining for many years the only science subject available at that level. 

The measure of the expansion that has taken place over the past thirty years is considerable; in 1962 there were some 370 pupils in St. Flannan's (140 of whom were day boys) and only 17 teachers. By 2004, the numbers had risen to more than 1,000 students and staff numbers had risen to 66. In September 2002, Coed classes were introduced in First Year. In September 2003, a new wing containing new facilities was opened. In 2009, the college experienced very severe flooding, with much of the college grounds being submerged and water breaching the perimeter wall because of a small stream that runs underneath the college.

Ranking
St Flannan's was ranked third in Ireland according to one of the most comprehensive league tables, published in The Irish Times, to date. The table was compiled by a research team at the University of Ulster and the Kemmy Business School at the University of Limerick in 2009.

Notable staff
 Gary Brennan - the Clare dual player teaches P.E. and Irish
 Jamesie O'Connor - the Clare hurler teaches business studies
 Thomas McRedmond - the first president of the Diocesean College in 1866, later Bishop of Killaloe
 Willie Walsh - the future bishop joined the staff in 1963

Notable past pupils

Academia
 Nicholas Canny - NUI Galway Professor Emeritus of History

Clergy
 Rev. Harry Bohan - priest and former manager of the Clare hurling team
 Rev. Austin Flannery OP - Dominican priest
 Rev. Thomas Flynn - Columban priest murdered in the Philippines
 Bishop Michael Fogarty - Professor in Carlow College & Maynooth College, Bishop of Killaloe (1904–54)
 Bishop Michael Harty - served as Bishop of Killaloe (1967–94)
 Bishop Denis Kelly - served as Bishop of Ross (1897-1924)
 Bishop John McCarthy DD (1858-1950) served as Bishop of Sandhurst in Victoria, Australia (1917-1950).
 Bishop Joseph Rodgers - served as Bishop of Killaloe (1955–66)
 Bishop Willie Walsh - served as Bishop of Killaloe (1994-2010)

Politics
 Sylvester Barrett - former Minister for Environment, Minister for Defence and MEP (Fianna Fáil)
 Michael D. Higgins - Former Minister for Arts, Culture and the Gaeltacht and ninth President of Ireland (Labour Party)
 Tony Killeen - former Minister for Defence (Fianna Fáil)
 Tomás Mac Giolla - former Lord Mayor of Dublin, former TD and former President of the Workers' Party
 Michael O'Kennedy - former Minister for Foreign Affairs, Minister for Finance, Minister for Agriculture, and European Commissioner (Fianna Fáil)
 Pat Upton - former Labour TD and Senator

Sport
 Anthony Daly - Dublin GAA senior hurling manager and double All-Ireland winning captain
 Jamesie O'Connor - Double All-Ireland winner, former GAA TV pundit on TV3, current hurling analyst on Sky Sports
 Davy Fitzgerald - Double All-Ireland winning goalkeeper, All-Ireland winning manager with Clare senior hurling team and current Wexford hurling manager
 Ger Loughnane - All-Ireland winning manager, GAA TV pundit on RTÉ's "The Sunday Game"

Television
 Maurice O'Doherty - Irish broadcaster best known as a newsreader for the RTÉ News from 1966 until 1983
 Seán Munsanje - TV presenter
 Marty Morrissey - sports presenter

Military
 Seán Clancy Chief of Staff of the Irish Defence Forces

References

1846 establishments in Ireland
Buildings and structures in Ennis
Educational institutions established in 1846
Education in Ennis
Secondary schools in County Clare